Zanaki may refer to:
Zanaki people of Tanzania
Zanaki language
Bruno César Zanaki, a Brazilian footballer

eo: Zanakioj